(born 6 July 1978) is a former freestyle swimmer from Japan. She competed for her native country at the 1996 Summer Olympics in Atlanta, Georgia. There, she finished in fourth place in the 4x20 0m freestyle relay, alongside Eri Yamanoi, Naoko Imoto, and Suzu Chiba. On her sole individual start, in the 80 0m freestyle, she ended up in 21st place, clocking 8:55.77 in the preliminary heats.

External links
 Japanese Olympic Committee

1978 births
Living people
Japanese female freestyle swimmers
Swimmers at the 1996 Summer Olympics
Olympic swimmers of Japan
20th-century Japanese women